is a former Japanese football player.

Playing career
Nakagomi was born in Yamanashi Prefecture on August 17, 1967. After graduating from Nippon Sport Science University, he joined Toshiba in 1990. He played many matches from first season. In 1994, he moved to Japan Football League (JFL) club PJM Futures. He played all matches in 1994 season. In 1995, he moved to JFL club Fukuoka Blux (later Avispa Fukuoka). He played as regular player and te club won the champions in 1995 and was promoted to J1 League from 1996. He retired end of 1997 season.

Club statistics

References

External links

1967 births
Living people
Nippon Sport Science University alumni
Association football people from Yamanashi Prefecture
Japanese footballers
Japan Soccer League players
J1 League players
Japan Football League (1992–1998) players
Hokkaido Consadole Sapporo players
Sagan Tosu players
Avispa Fukuoka players
Association football defenders